Hüseyin Daniş Tunalıgil (1915 – 22 October 1975) was a Turkish diplomat. He was assassinated by JCAG in 1975 during his duty as the Turkish ambassador to Austria.

Life and career
Tunalıgil was born in Ankara, Turkey in 1915. He graduated from Galatasaray High School in 1933. In 1939, he entered the Ministry of Foreign Affairs. During his diplomatic career he had been ambassador of Turkey to Jordan, Yugoslavia, the Netherlands and finally Austria.

Assassination
At noon, on 22 October 1975, three gunmen bearing automatic weapons ambushed the Turkish Embassy in Vienna, killing the security guards and entering the Ambassador's office. Once face to face with the ambassador, the militants asked if he was the Turkish ambassador. Receiving an affirmative answer, they shot him with British and Israeli made submachine guns.  Tunalıgil died on the spot and the militants quickly left the scene by an automobile. 

The attack was followed by another planned attack against the ambassador of Turkey to France, Ismail Erez on October 24, 1975 killing him and his chauffeur. 

The 3 militants were never identified and caught. It was the first assassination perpetrated by JCAG, and by 1984 it would have claimed the lives of 20 Turkish diplomats and members of their immediate families.

See also
 List of assassinated people from Turkey
 List of Turkish diplomats assassinated by Armenian militant organisations
 List of attacks by the Justice Commandos Against Armenian Genocide
 Assassination of Taha Carım
 Assassination of İsmail Erez
 ASALA

References 

1915 births
1975 deaths
People from Ankara
Assassinated Turkish diplomats
Galatasaray High School alumni
Turkish people murdered abroad
People murdered in Austria
Ambassadors of Turkey to the Netherlands
Ambassadors of Turkey to Austria
Ambassadors of Turkey to Yugoslavia
Ambassadors of Turkey to Jordan
1975 murders in Austria